Kathryn Ann Kelly "Kelly" McQueen (born June 27, 1962) is an American anesthesiologist and global health expert. She currently practices anesthesiology at the UW Health University Hospital in Madison, Wisconsin and serves as the chair for the Department of Anesthesiology at the University of Wisconsin School of Medicine and Public health.

Early years and education
McQueen was born at Fort Gordon Hospital in Augusta, Georgia, to Jon Anthony and Betty Kay Green. The family eventually moved to Littleton, Colorado where McQueen and her two sisters grew up, and she graduated from Littleton High School in 1980. McQueen earned a bachelor's degree in Biology from Colorado College in 1984 and graduated with a Doctor of Medicine from the University of Vermont College of Medicine in 1991. She completed her anesthesiology residency at the University of Arizona and Mayo Clinic Arizona in 1994 and 1995 respectively. In 1996 McQueen completed her obstetrical anesthesia fellowship at Mayo Clinic.

Additionally, she earned a Masters of Public Health from the Harvard T.H. Chan School of Public Health and completed a fellowship in Health Policy from American Association for the Advancement of Science in 2002.

Career
Upon completing her training, McQueen joined Valley Anesthesiology Consultants, a private practice in Phoenix, Arizona as a partner from 1996–2012. During her tenure in private practice, McQueen focused on OB, Pediatric and Ambulatory Anesthesia.  She was actively involved in teaching residents from the University of Arizona and the Mayo Clinic in Scottsdale, AZ.  She served as an Adjunct Clinical Professor to the Mayo Clinic, and was the Education Liaison between Valley Anesthesia Consultants and the Mayo Clinic Scottsdale.  She was also active in the delivery of humanitarian assistance during this time, often taking months away from her practice to serve overseas.

In 2012 McQueen was recruited to the Department of Anesthesiology at Vanderbilt University Medical Center.  She served as the Director to the Vanderbilt Global Anesthesia Programs and Development, and started the Vanderbilt Multidisciplinary Global Journal Club and the Vanderbilt Global Anesthesia Fellowship.  Her research programs took her to Guatemala, Ethiopia, Kenya, Mozambique, and South Africa.  She taught in Australia annually, at the National Critical Care and Trauma Response Center in Darwin, Australia.  She provide many keynote addresses around the globe and scores of academic presentations focusing on surgical and anesthesia infrastructure in low and middle-income countries, and the global anesthesia and patient safety crisis in these same countries.  Her research focus eventually focused on surgical and anesthesia outcomes, especially perioperative mortality rates.  She also began working on Enhanced Recovery After Surgery (ERAS) approaches for low and middle-income countries.

In Oct 2019, McQueen moved to Madison, WI to lead the Department of Anesthesiology within the University of Wisconsin School of Medicine and Public Health. Leading the oldest academic department of anesthesiology in the United States offered unique opportunities for McQueen.  Her leadership has focused on bringing equity and transparency to all aspects of the department's tripartite mission of clinical excellence, education and training, and research.  Since her arrival she has started efforts focusing on enhancing Diversity, Equity and Inclusivity, and improving Wellbeing.  It is her goal to create departmental programs, while also aligning with the University of Wisconsin School of Medicine and Public Health and UW Health University Hospital. She is creating a Global Academic Anesthesia Consortium, that is committed to education and training in low-income settings and is a collaboration between many like-minded US Academic Anesthesia Programs. She has also started a sustainable Global Anesthesia Program, with current efforts focused in Rwanda and Zambia.

Currently, McQueen serves as a Professor and the Ralph Waters Distinguished Chair for the Department of Anesthesiology at the University of Wisconsin School of Medicine and Public Health, and continues to actively research outcomes and opportunities for system improvements in low and middle-income countries.

In 2022, McQueen was elected to serve on the executive board for the Multicenter Perioperative Outcomes Group (MPOG).

Humanitarian aid and disaster relief

McQueen's first involvement in humanitarian work was as a medical student in the Dominican Republic.  During her residency, she joined an Obstetrical Team for People to People on a trip to Russia in 1992. Since then, she has committed time annually to serving humanitarian and disaster relief organizations including Doctors Without Borders and Operation Smile.

She became a fellow of the Harvard Humanitarian Initiative (HHI) after completing her MPH at the Harvard School of Public Health in 2002.  . During her time as an HHI fellow, McQueen transitioned from providing service overseas to researching infrastructure and outcomes, and focusing on education and training to improve surgery and anesthesia in low and middle-income countries. She has taught extensively around the world on topics of Anesthesia for Austere Environments and Anesthesia delivery during humanitarian crises and following disasters.  She eventually founded the Burden of Surgical Disease Working Group, and later Alliance for Surgery and Anesthesia Presence (ASAP) and The Global Surgical Consortium. McQueen is also currently a member of the World Health Organization's Global Initiative on Emergency and Essential Surgical Care (GIEESC).

Medical missions
Ordered chronologically:
 1988: Dominican Republic 
 1992: People to People Delegation on OB, Russia, Latvia and Lithuania 
 1996: American Society of Anesthesiologists Overseas Teaching Program, Tanzania 
 1998, 1999: Operation Smile, China
 1999, 2004: Operation Smile, Jordan
 2000: Operation Smile,  Brazil
 2001: Doctors Without Borders, Sri Lanka
 2002: Operation Smile, Peru
 2003: Operation Smile in collaboration with Partners in Health Hinche, Haiti 
 2006: American Society of Anesthesiologists, Haiti
 2009: American Society of Anesthesiologists, Ethiopia
 2012: American Society of Anesthesiologists, Rwanda

Public health career

After receiving her MPH from the Harvard School of Public Health in 2002, McQueen went on to complete a fellowship at the American Association for the Advancement of Science (AAAS) from 2002–2003. During her fellowship, she served at the Office of Naval Research where she worked with the US Navy's International Field Offices on infectious disease topics. The Anthrax letter scare of 2002 occurred during her tenure with AAAS, prompting McQueen to plan and coordinate a bilateral meeting with Mexico on Emerging Infectious Disease Threats in Latin America in Cuernavaca, Mexico in September 2003.

Since 2003, McQueen has combined a career in anesthesiology with a global public health career.  Soon after completing the AAAS fellowship, she began focusing on the role of surgery and safe anesthesia in global public health.  While the public health community only initially endorsed emergency surgery as an important component of population based health, her worked informed the literature and eventually the global community on the importance of both emergency and essential surgery for all populations.

Leadership

In 2006, she founded the Burden of Surgical Disease Working Group and served as its leader until its transition to the Alliance of Surgery and Anesthesia Presence (ASAP) in 2010. ASAP later became the 6th integrated society of the International Society of Surgeons;   she was the inaugural president from 2013–15. In 2007, McQueen developed the idea for the Global Surgical Consortium (GSC), a 501c3 non-profit organization, which was officially established in 2010

McQueen also became one of the founding board members of the G4 Alliance in 2015.
McQueen continues to serve as founder and President of GSC. She has also served as the American Society of Anesthesiologists Global Humanitarian Outreach Committee Chair from 2009-2015.  Since 2011 she has been a board member to the American Society of Anesthesiology Charitable Foundation. From 2017-2019 she served as a board member to the Shalom Foundation. Since 2021 she serves on the University of Wisconsin Medical Foundation Board of Directors.

Charitable activities

In 2010, McQueen founded The Global Surgical Consortium, a 501c3 non-profit organization and charity dedicated to providing the evidence and data required for the building of surgical infrastructure in low-income countries.

Author

McQueen is the author of multiple peer-reviewed research and review articles, and is the author of two children's books, What's A Virus Anyway, published in 1990, and Let’s Talk Trash, published in 1992. In 1991, What's A Virus Anyway was awarded the Benjamin Franklin Children's Book Award.

The Global Anesthesia Crisis

McQueen's work was informed by her research on access to and infrastructure for surgery and safe anesthesia in many low and middle income countries.

Awards

In 1997, McQueen earned an award from the AOA Honor Medical Society. Later in 2010, McQueen earned the International College of Surgeons Surgical Volunteerism and Humanitarian Award from the International College of Surgeons. She also received the Arizona Medical Association Humanitarian Award in 2011 and the Colorado College Benezet Lifetime Achievement Award in 2012. In 2016, she received the University of Vermont College of Medicine Service in Medicine Award and later received the Nicholas M. Greene, M.D., Outstanding Humanitarian Contribution award in 2017.

Publications
Her most cited publications are:

  According to Google scholar, the article has been cited 156 times through May 2016
  According to Google scholar, the article has been cited 81 times through May 2016 
  According to Google scholar, the article has been cited 86 times through May 2016  
  According to Google scholar, the article has been cited 73 times through May 2016   
  According to Google scholar, the article has been cited 69 times through May 2016

References

American anesthesiologists
1962 births
Living people
University of Vermont alumni
Colorado College alumni
Vanderbilt University faculty
People from Augusta, Georgia
People from Littleton, Colorado
Harvard School of Public Health alumni
Women anesthesiologists
21st-century American women physicians
21st-century American physicians